Overtown railway station, also known as Overtown Road railway station, served the village of Overtown, North Lanarkshire, Scotland from 1843 to 1942 on the Wishaw and Coltness Railway.

History

First station 
The first station opened on 8 May 1843 by the Wishaw and Coltness Railway. To the northwest was a private line that served Overtown Station Colliery and Coltness Iron Works. To the south was a dock line. The station disappeared from Bradshaw in March 1848 but reappeared in April 1850. A second station opened in January 1881, rendering this one obsolete so it closed on 1 October 1881.

Second station 
The second station opened as Overtown Waterloo in January 1881. It was located closer to Waterloo than Overtown, hence the name. It was renamed Overtown in 1886. There were no goods facilities but it had a footbridge and station buildings. The station closed on 1 January 1917 but reopened on 1 January 1919, before closing permanently on 5 October 1942.

References

External links 

Disused railway stations in North Lanarkshire
Railway stations in Great Britain opened in 1843
Railway stations in Great Britain closed in 1917
Railway stations in Great Britain opened in 1919
Railway stations in Great Britain closed in 1942 
1843 establishments in Scotland
1942 disestablishments in Scotland
Former Caledonian Railway stations